Magaadu may refer to:
 Magaadu (1976 film), a Telugu-language action film
 Magaadu (1990 film), a Telugu-language film